West Pomio/Mamusi Rural LLG is a local-level government (LLG) of East New Britain Province, Papua New Guinea. The Upper dialect of the Ata language is spoken in the LLG.

Wards
01. Gugulena
02. Malmal
03. Manginuna
04. Totongpal
05. Kaiton
06. Puapal
07. Rowan/Malo
08. Pomai/Mu
09. Poro/Salel
10. Irena
11. Kangelona
12. Mauna
13. Lau
14. Bairaman
15. Tolel
16. Maitao
17. Serenguna
18. Paliavulu
19. Viosopuna
20. Pokapuna
21. Bili
22. Pakia
23. Okempuna
24. Kaitoto
25. Mapuna
26. Peling
27. Aona
28. Yauyau
29. Kaikou
30. Kinsena
31. Ulutu
32. Kerongkorona
33. Sivaona
34. Pepeng

References

Local-level governments of East New Britain Province